The meridian 89° east of Greenwich is a line of longitude that extends from the North Pole across the Arctic Ocean, Asia, the Indian Ocean, the Southern Ocean, and Antarctica to the South Pole.

The 89th meridian east forms a great circle with the 91st meridian west.

From Pole to Pole
Starting at the North Pole and heading south to the South Pole, the 89th meridian east passes through:

{| class="wikitable plainrowheaders"
! scope="col" width="120" | Co-ordinates
! scope="col" | Country, territory or sea
! scope="col" | Notes
|-
| style="background:#b0e0e6;" | 
! scope="row" style="background:#b0e0e6;" | Arctic Ocean
| style="background:#b0e0e6;" |
|-
| style="background:#b0e0e6;" | 
! scope="row" style="background:#b0e0e6;" | Kara Sea
| style="background:#b0e0e6;" |
|-
| 
! scope="row" | 
| Krasnoyarsk Krai — Kirov Islands
|-
| style="background:#b0e0e6;" | 
! scope="row" style="background:#b0e0e6;" | Kara Sea
| style="background:#b0e0e6;" |
|-valign="top"
| 
! scope="row" | 
| Krasnoyarsk Krai Tomsk Oblast — from  Krasnoyarsk Krai — from  Kemerovo Oblast — from  Krasnoyarsk Krai — from  Republic of Khakassia — from  Kemerovo Oblast — from  Republic of Khakassia — from  Kemerovo Oblast — from  Republic of Khakassia — from  Kemerovo Oblast — from  Republic of Khakassia — from  Tuva Republic — from  Altai Republic — from 
|-
| 
! scope="row" | 
|
|-valign="top"
| 
! scope="row" | 
| Xinjiang Tibet — from 
|-
| 
! scope="row" | 
|
|-
| 
! scope="row" | 
| West Bengal
|-
| 
! scope="row" | 
| For about 13 km
|-
| 
! scope="row" | 
| West Bengal - for about 7 km
|-
| 
! scope="row" | 
|
|-
| 
! scope="row" | 
| West Bengal - for about 4 km
|-
| 
! scope="row" | 
|
|-
| 
! scope="row" | 
| West Bengal - for about 6 km
|-
| 
! scope="row" | 
| For about 11 km
|-
| 
! scope="row" | 
| West Bengal
|-
| style="background:#b0e0e6;" | 
! scope="row" style="background:#b0e0e6;" | Indian Ocean
| style="background:#b0e0e6;" |
|-
| style="background:#b0e0e6;" | 
! scope="row" style="background:#b0e0e6;" | Southern Ocean
| style="background:#b0e0e6;" |
|-
| 
! scope="row" | Antarctica
| Australian Antarctic Territory, claimed by 
|-
|}

e089 meridian east